Birtwell is a surname. Notable people with the surname include: 

Alec Birtwell (1908–1974), English cricketer
Celia Birtwell (born 1941), British textile and fashion designer
Ian Birtwell (born 1944), English rugby player and coach